Torijan Lyne-Lewis is a New Zealand-born Samoan footballer who plays as a midfielder and a forward. She is a member of the Samoa women's national football team. In New Zealand, she plays for Wairarapa United.

Lyne-Lewis was born in New Zealand and is of Samoan and Indonesian heritage. She works as an aquatic centre manager. She played football for Levin AFC, Massey University, and Palmerston North Marist FC. In 2020 she moved to Wairarapa United. In 2021 she was awarded the Golden Boot in the Lower North Island competition.

In 2017 Lyne-Lewis was selected for the Futsal Ferns.

In June 2019 she was named to the Samoa women's national football team for the 2019 Pacific Games. The team won silver, with Lyne-Lewis scoring Samoa's only goal in the competition final against Papua New Guinea. In July 2022 she was named to the squad for the 2022 OFC Women's Nations Cup.

In 2021 Lyne-Lewis was appointed a football ambassador by the Oceania Football Confederation as part of its women's football strategy.

References

Living people
People with acquired Samoan citizenship
Samoan women's footballers
Women's association football midfielders
Samoa women's international footballers
New Zealand women's association footballers
New Zealand sportspeople of Samoan descent
New Zealand people of Indonesian descent
1995 births